Aphragmus is a genus of flowering plants belonging to the family Brassicaceae.

Its native range is Southwestern Siberia to Himalaya and Aleutian Islands.

Species:

Aphragmus bouffordii 
Aphragmus eschscholtziana 
Aphragmus himalaicus 
Aphragmus hinkuensis 
Aphragmus hobsonii 
Aphragmus involucratus 
Aphragmus ladakianus 
Aphragmus minutus 
Aphragmus nepalensis 
Aphragmus obscurus 
Aphragmus ohbana 
Aphragmus oxycarpus 
Aphragmus pygmaeus 
Aphragmus serpens

References

Brassicaceae
Brassicaceae genera